Murilo Bedusco dos Santos or simply Murilo (born January 5, 1984 in Curitiba), is a Brazilian right back. He currently plays for Joinville.

Contract
Toledo Colônia Work-PR (Loan) 8 January 2008 to 30 April 2008
Atlético-PR 1 August 2003 to 1 August 2008

External links
 CBF
 lecmania
 bolarolando
 furacao
 zanziball
  precoma
 websoccerclub

1984 births
Living people
Brazilian footballers
Club Athletico Paranaense players
Clube Atlético Bragantino players
J. Malucelli Futebol players
Rio Branco Sport Club players
Paraná Clube players
Ceará Sporting Club players
Associação Atlética Ponte Preta players
ABC Futebol Clube players
Guaratinguetá Futebol players
Joinville Esporte Clube players
Atlético Clube Goianiense players
Association football defenders
Footballers from Curitiba